Chukwuemeka Ezeife (born 20 November 1938) is a Nigerian politician who was elected governor of Anambra State in Nigeria from January 1992 to November 1993 during the Nigerian Third Republic.

Background

Ezeife was born at Igbo-Ukwu, Anambra State on 20 November 1939. He did not attend secondary school, but taught himself through correspondence courses, qualifying for university admission. He gained a BSc in Economics from the University College Ibadan, then attended Harvard University on a Rockefeller Foundation scholarship where he obtain a  masters and then PhD degree in 1972.
He became a School Headmaster, a lecturer at Makarare University College, Kampala, Uganda, a Teaching Fellow at Harvard University, and a Consultant with Arthur D. Little in Cambridge, Massachusetts.
Ezeife joined the civil service as an Administrative Officer and rose to the position of Permanent Secretary.

Political career

Ezeife was elected governor of Anambra State on the Social Democratic Party (SDP) platform, holding office from 2 January 1992 to 17 November 1993, when General Sani Abacha took power after a military coup.
As governor, he was said to be more interested in planning than in addressing immediate developmental needs, and achieved few tangible results.
He transferred Nnamdi Azikiwe University and Federal Polytechnic, Oko to the federal government, which helped ensure that they survived in the ensuing military regime.

During the Nigerian Fourth Republic Ezeife, who describes himself as a social democrat, was appointed presidential Adviser on Political Matters to President Olusegun Obasanjo.

Later career

Ezeife was appointed a member of the board of the Center for Development & Empowerment of Commercial Motorcyclists.
In February 2006 the Federal Capital development Authority bulldozed his house in Abuja on the grounds that the plot of land and those of adjacent houses had been acquired improperly.
In January 2010 he was among thousands who demonstrated in Awka calling for credible and violence-free governorship elections on February 6.
In April 2010 one of Ezeife's wives, Onyedi, was kidnapped by hoodlums who had earlier killed four policemen. The kidnappers demanded a high ransom.

References 

1939 births
Living people
Social Democratic Party (Nigeria) politicians
Governors of Anambra State
Harvard University alumni
Nigerian Permanent Secretaries